Serine/threonine-protein kinase PLK4 also known as polo-like kinase 4 is an enzyme that in humans is encoded by the PLK4 gene. The Drosophila homolog is SAK, the C elegans homolog is zyg-1, and the Xenopus homolog is Plx4.

Function 

PLK4 encodes a member of the polo family of serine/threonine protein kinases. The protein localizes to centrioles—complex microtubule-based structures found in centrosomes—and regulates centriole duplication during the cell cycle. Overexpression of PLK4 results in centrosome amplification, and knockdown of PLK4 results in loss of centrosomes.

Structure 
PLK4 contains an N-terminal kinase domain (residues 12-284) and a C-terminal localization domain (residues 596-898). Other polo-like kinase members contain 2 C-terminal polo box domains (PBD). PLK4 contains these 2 domains in addition to a third PBD, which facilitates oligomerization, targeting, and promotes trans-autophosphorylation, limiting centriole duplication to once per cell cycle.

As a cancer drug target 

Inhibitors of the enzymatic activity PLK4 have potential in the treatment of cancer. The PLK4 inhibitor R1530 down regulates the expression of mitotic checkpoint kinase BubR1 that in turn leads to polyploidy rendering cancer cells unstable and more sensitive to cancer chemotherapy.  Furthermore, normal cells are resistant to the polyploidy inducing effects of R1530.

Another PLK4 inhibitor, CFI-400945 has demonstrated efficacy in animal models of breast and ovarian cancer.

Another PLK4 inhibitor, centrinone, has been reported to deplete centrioles in human and other vertebrate cell types, which resulted in a p53-dependent cell cycle arrest in G1. Inhibition of PLK4 using a chemical genetic strategy has validated this p53-dependent cell cycle arrest in G1.

PLK4 was also identified as a potential therapeutic target for malignant rhabdoid tumors, medulloblastomas and possibly, other embryonal tumors of the brain.

Interactions and substrates 

Documented PLK4 substrates include STIL, GCP6, Hand1, Ect2, FBXW5, and itself (via autophosphorylation). Autophosphorylation of PLK4 results in ubiquitination and subsequent destruction by the proteasome.

PLK4 has been shown to interact with Stratifin.

References

Further reading

External links 

EC 2.7.11